Scarabaspis is a genus of mites in the family Eviphididae. There is at least one described species in Scarabaspis, S. inexpectatus.

References

Mesostigmata
Articles created by Qbugbot